Norman Ramirez-Talavera is a Puerto Rican nationalist who had the fines imposed on him in the 1983 armored car robbery in West Hartford, Connecticut, case remitted under the terms of  President Bill Clinton's clemency offer on September 7, 1999. Maldonado-Rivera had already served the terms of his prison sentence and had been released several years prior to Clinton's offer.

See also
 Oscar Collazo
 Alejandrina Torres
 Puerto Rican independence movement

References

Living people
History of Puerto Rico
Puerto Rican nationalists
Puerto Rican prisoners and detainees
Puerto Rican independence activists
Year of birth missing (living people)